Dieter Brömme is a German-Canadian biochemist, currently a Canada Research Chair in Proteases and Diseases at University of British Columbia.

References

Year of birth missing (living people)
Living people
Academic staff of the University of British Columbia Faculty of Medicine
Canadian biochemists